The List of MMA Tombs includes all tombs excavated by Herbert Eustis Winlock (1884–1950), an archeologist who worked for the Metropolitan Museum of Art. Some of the tombs also have a TT-designation, which refers to their provenience in the Theban Necropolis of Egypt.

List of MMA Tombs

References

Theban Necropolis
Theban tombs
MMA Tombs
MMA Tombs
MMA Tombs